Sagala is a village and seat of the rural commune of Bellen in the Ségou Cercle in the Ségou Region of southern-central Mali. The village lies 89 km northwest of Ségou and 81 km east of Niono.

References

Populated places in Ségou Region